Just Like a Woman is a 1981 studio album from Kikki Danielsson. At the Swedish album chart, the album peaked at 20th position.

The song "Lättare sagt än gjort" charted at Svensktoppen for four weeks between 7 June–20 September 1981 (including the summer break), peaking at fifth position.

Track listing

Side A

Side B

Charts

References

1981 albums
Kikki Danielsson albums